Anjaana is a 1969 Hindi-language romance film produced and directed by Mohan Kumar. The film stars Rajendra Kumar, Babita, Pran,  Prem Chopra and Nirupa Roy. The music is by Laxmikant Pyarelal.

Plot
Raju lives with his widowed mother, Janki, in a small town and works as garage mechanic. One day he meets with wealthy Rachna Malhotra, and after a few misunderstandings, both fall in love with each other. When Rachna's guardian, Diwan Mahendranat, finds out he forbids Rachna to ever see Raju again, as well as goes to Raju's house and humiliates his mother, for he wants Rachna to marry his son, Ramesh. An enraged Raju wants to avenge this humiliation and decides to teach Mahendranath a lesson. He enlists the help of his maternal uncle, Chamanlal Kapoor (Sunder), and together they succeed in fooling Mahendranath and making him give up all his money. But at the very last moment, Mahendranath finds out that he has been tricked, and together he and Ramesh conceive a plan that will bring Raju and his mother to their knees - a plan that will change their lives forever.

Cast
 Rajendra Kumar as Raju
 Babita as Rachna Malhotra
Nirupa Roy as Raju's Mother
Pran as Diwan Mahendranath
Prem Chopra as Ramesh
Sunder as Chamanlal Kapoor (Cooper)
Nazima as Munni
Mohan Choti as Lallu
Tuntun as Aunt Pampi (Mrs. Cooper)
Mehmood Jr. as William

Soundtrack
The soundtrack was composed by Laxmikant–Pyarelal on lyrics of Anand Bakshi.

References

External links 
 

1969 films
1960s Hindi-language films
Films scored by Laxmikant–Pyarelal
Films directed by Mohan Kumar